Perungalathur is a southern suburb of Chennai, Tamil Nadu, India. A residential locality in southern part of the metropolitan area of Chennai, the town is served by Perungalathur Railway Station of the Chennai Suburban Railway Network. Perungulathur is main bus boarding station for passengers to reach all southern cities of Kerala and Tamil Nadu, Ancient Shiva Temple, located in Perungulathur is about 800 years old. The Kamatchi Amman Temple and Aadhi Karaneeswarar Temple are also popular. Recently Government of Tamil Nadu has proposed to upgrade Tambaram to Corporation by expanding its territory till Perungulathur.

Demographics
As of 2011 India census, Perungulathur had a population of 37,342. Males constitute 41% of the population and females 59%. Perungulathur has an average literacy rate of 69%, higher than the national average of 59.5%: male literacy is 85%, and female literacy is 79%. In Perungulathur, 10% of the population is under 6 years of age.

Location
Perungulathur is located on NH45 highway between Tambaram and Vandalur. Perungulathur and Peerkankaranai are twin towns which share and complement much of their resources and infrastructures alike. It is well connected by rail and road links.

Transportation
The proximity of Tambaram railway junction and Arignar Anna Zoological Park in Vandalur has given Perungalathur good connectivity with places like Chennai, Chengalpattu and Kanchipuram. Industrial estates like Guindy, Maraimalai Nagar, Padappai, Oragadam and Sriperumbudur are easily accessible via road or rail. Residents of adjoining areas like Peerkankaranai, Sadanandhapuram, Old Perungulathur Annai Indra Nagar and RMK Nagar avail transport facilities from Perungulathur. Perungulathur is the hub for most of tourist bus operators and many have offices opposite to first railway gate. All MTC buses towards Vandalur passes through Perungulathur.

Perungulathur railway station is about 30 km from Chennai Central. Southern Railway is currently renovating and expanding the station, including extension of platforms. The two existing platforms were laid during the British era when most trains had nine compartments and are now being extended to accommodate 12-car trains. Currently, over 10,000 commuters use the station daily. All 84 suburban trains halting at the station have 12 compartments. A new rail line exclusively for express trains is also planned.

Lakes
The town has two lakes, one in Peerkankaranai, adjacent to NH-45 and another Perungulathur lake behind the Vedanta Desika Srinivasa Perumal Temple.  Much of Peerkankaranai Lake was filled during the widening of NH-45 highway and the remaining area is shrinking due to dumping of solid wastes and encroachments. Perungulathur Lake, spread over an area of 55 acres, gives the name to this town meaning "A Place with Big pond" (Perum – Kulam – Urr).

References

Further reading
 http://m.timesofindia.com/city/chennai/pallavaram-tambaram-avadi-to-be-corporations/articleshow/57834426.cms

Cities and towns in Chengalpattu district
Suburbs of Chennai